Taiseer Abdul-Hussein (born 30 November 1978) is a coach and former international Iraqi football player, he played as a midfielder.

References

External links
 
 Iraq - Record International Players  rsssf.com (in Arabic)

Iraqi footballers
Iraqi expatriate footballers
Living people
Expatriate footballers in Jordan
1978 births
Association football midfielders
Iraq international footballers
Al-Shorta SC players